Bayville (sometimes also referred to as Pine Island) is a village located in the Town of Oyster Bay in Nassau County, on the North Shore of Long Island, in New York, United States. The population was 6,669 at the 2010 census.

The Incorporated Village of Bayville is located on the Long Island Sound facing Greenwich, Connecticut.

History 
Bayville incorporated as a village in 1919 during the incorporated village movement which allowed many larger estate owners on Long Island to establish political and security control over their domains.

Like many other Long Island communities, Bayville was first occupied by the Matinecock Indians and was known as Oak Neck and Pine Island. In 1658, Oyster Bay resident Daniel Whitehead purchased the land from the tribes. By 1745, the land was split among 23 men, who mainly grew asparagus. In 1859, Oak Neck was renamed Bayville and the first Methodist church was constructed west of what is now Merritt Lane. Multiple estates were built in the surrounding areas, and in 1898 a drawbridge was built, connecting Bayville and Mill Neck.

In 1909, the Bayville Casino opened for business, attracting beachgoers, and in 1919, Winslow S. Pierce, who owned the Dunstable Estate in town, was elected the first mayor of the Village of Bayville. The Dunstable Estate was sold to Harrison Williams and renamed "Oak Point".. When the Arlington Hotel, Bayville Casino, and Ritzmore Estate burned to the ground, it prompted the creation of the Bayville Fire Department. Bayville was put on the front page of many newspapers in 1927 when the rum rummer William T. Bell ran ashore at the Oak Point estate. Things were a little slow for a while, but after World War II, the community began to boom. A new church, post office, and school were built in the span of three years, and from 1950 to 1960, the population doubled.

The Bayville Bridge, one of two entrances into the village, opened in 1938 and is a major landmark and tourist attraction; it is the fourth bridge at that location.

The village celebrated its centennial in 2019.

Geography

Demographics

As of the census of 2000, there were 7,135 people, 2,566 households, and 1,906 families residing in the village. The population density was 5,065.7 people per square mile (1,953.8/km2). There were 2,683 housing units at an average density of 1,904.9 per square mile (734.7/km2). The racial makeup of the village was 96.01% White, 0.31% African American, 0.24% Native American, 1.64% Asian, 1.08% from other races, and 0.73% from two or more races. Hispanic or Latino of any race were 4.82% of the population.

There were 2,566 households, out of which 33.6% had children under the age of 18 living with them, 61.1% were married couples living together, 9.7% had a female householder with no husband present, and 25.7% were non-families. 20.6% of all households were made up of individuals, and 7.6% had someone living alone who was 65 years of age or older. The average household size was 2.74 and the average family size was 3.20.

In the village, the population was spread out, with 23.6% under the age of 18, 5.9% from 18 to 24, 29.6% from 25 to 44, 27.5% from 45 to 64, and 13.4% who were 65 years of age or older. The median age was 40 years. For every 100 females, there were 95.9 males. For every 100 females age 18 and over, there were 95.0 males.

The median income for a household in the village was $68,380, and the median income for a family was $77,838. Males had a median income of $50,969 versus $38,304 for females. The per capita income for the village was $33,665. About 2.7% of families and 4.7% of the population were below the poverty line, including 3.7% of those under age 18 and 8.3% of those age 65 or over.

Government 
As of October 2022, the Mayor of Bayville is longtime resident Steve Minicozzi and the Village Trustees are Valerie M. Belcher, Patricia Farnell, Robert M. Nigro, Elisa Santoro, and Peter B. Valsecchi.

Notable people
 Harrison Williams, 20th-century entrepreneur, investor and multi-millionaire
 Jackie Martling, former writer for the Howard Stern Show
 Rick Pitino, former NBA and NCAA basketball coach
 Tommy Sheehan, contestant and winner of Survivor: Island of the Idols

References

External links
Official website

Villages in New York (state)
Long Island Sound
Villages in Nassau County, New York
Populated coastal places in New York (state)